Puya solomonii is a species in the genus Puya. This species is endemic to Bolivia.

References

solomonii
Flora of Bolivia